Parachute Tower in Katowice is a 35-metre tall lattice parachute tower built in 1937 for training parachute jumps. It was used in the first days of World War II by the 73rd infantry regiment as an observation tower.

The parachute Tower in Katowice is the only existing parachute tower in Poland.

Defense of the Tower on 4 September 1939 
During the first days of the German invasion of Poland, on 4 September, several Polish Boy and Girl Scouts shot German troops from it, most were killed, with at least 10 fatalities. This incident is the best remembered part of the defense of Katowice by irregular Polish units that occurred on that day and has been described as "legendary". Older accounts suggested that the tower was defended for many hours, through newer research suggest that the incident was much shorter. When research debunking the older version was first published, it was described as controversial and led to a number of protests.

See also
 List of towers

References

External links

 http://www.skyscraperpage.com/diagrams/?b7600

Towers in Poland
Towers completed in 1937
Buildings and structures in Katowice
Tourist attractions in Katowice
Katowice